The Department of Environment, Food and Agriculture is one of nine departments of the Isle of Man Government.  It was created on 1 April 2010, taking over the former Department of Agriculture, Fisheries and Forestry along with the environment functions from the former Department of Local Government and the Environment.

The current Minister for Environment, Food and Agriculture is Geoffrey Boot MHK.

Functions

Agriculture
Animal Health
Forestry
Fisheries
Biodiversity
Protection of the Countryside
Environmental Protection and Improvements
Climate Change
Coastline Protection Policy and Monitoring 
Waste Regulation
Food Safety
Environmental Public Health Government Analyst

Ministers for Environment, Food and Agriculture
Geoffrey Boot MHK, 13 October 2016 – present
Richard Ronan MHK, 2 July 2014 – 12 October 2016
Phil Gawne MHK, 14 October 2011 – 1 July 2014
John Shimmin MHK, 1 April 2010 – 13 October 2011

References

External links
 Department of Environment, Food and Agriculture

Government of the Isle of Man
Forestry agencies in the United Kingdom
Environmental agencies in the United Kingdom